Les Collégiennes is a 1957 comedy-drama directed by André Hunebelle and starring Marie-Hélène Arnaud, Christine Carère and Estella Blain. It is the film debut of Catherine Deneuve (credited as Catherine Dorléac).

Cast 

 Marie-Hélène Arnaud  as Catherine Royer
 Christine Carère as Monique
 Estella Blain as Martha
 Gaby Morlay as Madame Ancelin
 Henri Guisol as Christian Brenner
 Véronique Verlhac as Solange
 Agnès Laurent  as Anne-Marie
 Paul Guers as Gilles Mareuil
 Sophie Daumier as Nicole
 Jacqueline Corot as Sophie
 Anna Gaylor as Geneviève
 Anita Treyens as Betty
 Sylvie Dorléac as Adélaïde
 Madeleine Barbulée as Madame Letellier
 Made Siamé as Supervisor of the Girls
 Elga Andersen as Hélène
 Fernand Fabre as Doctor
 Catherine Deneuve as Schoolgirl
 Gérard Barray as Television Journalist
 Yvonne Monlaur as Older Girl
 Georgina Spelvin as Topless Girl #2 (US Insert, Uncredited)
 Louisa Colpeyn
 Marcelle Hainia

Release 
The film was released in France in 1957 by Sirius Films and in America in 1961 by Audubon Films, for which the film was dubbed and re-edited and additional footage added by Radley Metzger, making the film more explicit.

References

External links 

Les Collégiennes on Ciné-Ressources
Les Collégiennes on UniFrance

1957 films
1957 comedy-drama films
1950s French-language films
1950s romantic comedy-drama films
Films set in boarding schools
Films directed by André Hunebelle
French comedy-drama films
French romantic comedy-drama films
1950s French films